The 2016 Catalan motorcycle Grand Prix was the seventh round of the 2016 MotoGP season. It was held at the Circuit de Barcelona-Catalunya in Montmeló on 5 June 2016.

The weekend was overshadowed by the death of Moto2 rider Luis Salom, as he was killed in a crash at Europcar (motorcycle Turn 12) during Free Practice 2 on Friday, approximately 25 minutes before the end of the session. For the remainder of the weekend, the track layout was altered to use the configuration used by Formula One since 2007, in order to reduce speeds in the part of the circuit where Salom's accident occurred. The altered layout included the replacement of the long sweeping corner at La Caixa with a slower hairpin and the insertion of a chicane between Europcar (the penultimate turn) and New Holland (final turn).

Further adjustments were made to the circuit by safety officials following an evaluation conducted with a group of riders on Friday evening. The changes included narrowing the chicane by two metres on the outside, creating a gravel trap in the run-off area of the chicane and making the chicane a permanent yellow flag zone during the event.  Following the 2016 season, the FIM, FIA and the circuit agreed to move the chicane up by a few metres for motorcycles.  This modification, which was constructed for the 2017 winter testing season, added additional run-off areas for motorcycles and ease the entrance to pit lane.  However, after the first practice of the 2017 race, the chicane was deemed dangerous and was reverted to the car chicane because of concerns over the surface change between the intended motorcycle and the car chicanes.  Following the removal of seating in the area and additional runoff, the chicane will be eliminated in 2018.

This event also saw the end of the controversial rivalry between Valentino Rossi and Marc Márquez since it began at the 2015 Malaysian Grand Prix, when Rossi shook hands with Márquez at the parc fermé post-race. Rossi later said that the handshake was the right thing to do following Salom's death.

Pre-race
Significant amounts of speculation concerning the top riders and their plans for 2017 culminated in a series of riders announcing their future teams. Marc Márquez confirmed he would partner teammate Dani Pedrosa for a further two seasons at Repsol Honda, while it was announced that Tech 3 pairing Bradley Smith and Pol Espargaró would move to the new factory KTM squad.

Following Maverick Viñales's previous confirmation alongside Valentino Rossi at Yamaha, and reigning champion Jorge Lorenzo's confirmed move to Ducati, the only factory seats remaining were those alongside Andrea Iannone and Sam Lowes at Suzuki and Aprilia respectively.

Classification

MotoGP

Moto2

Moto3

Championship standings after the race (MotoGP)
Below are the standings for the top five riders and constructors after round seven has concluded.

Riders' Championship standings

Constructors' Championship standings

 Note: Only the top five positions are included for both sets of standings.

Notes

References

Catalan
Catalan Motorcycle Grand Prix
motorcycle
Catalan motorcycle Grand Prix
Catalan
Motorcycle racing controversies